Halydaia mackerrasi is a species of tachinid flies in the genus Halydaia of the family Tachinidae.

Distribution
Australia.

References

Diptera of Australasia
Taxa named by Sergey Paramonov (entomologist)
Dexiinae
Insects described in 1960